Nikolaus Becker (8 October 1809, Bonn, Rhin-et-Moselle – 28 August 1845 in the Hünshoven district of Geilenkirchen) was a German lawyer and writer. His one poem of note was the 1840 "Rheinlied" (Rhine song) which was set to music over 70 times, the most famous setting being  Die Wacht am Rhein.

The Rhine Song
While the French–German enmity already was about 200 years old, it was inspired by the Rhine crisis of 1840, caused by the French prime minister Adolphe Thiers, who again voiced demands that France should own the left bank of the Rhine (described as France's "natural boundary"), as France had done decades earlier during Napoleons reign. In response, Becker wrote a poem called Rheinlied, which contained the verse: "Sie sollen ihn nicht haben, den freien, deutschen Rhein ..." (They shall not have him, the free, German Rhine).

This patriotic poem brought him much praise throughout Germany. The Prussian King Friedrich Wilhelm IV sent him 1000 Thaler, and King Ludwig I of Bavaria honoured him with a goblet. The "Rheinlied" was set to music over 70 times, amongst others by Robert Schumann, and other Rheinlied songs followed, the most famous being Die Wacht am Rhein. The wording was mostly defensive.

The French answered, with Alfred de Musset: "Nous l'avons eu, votre Rhin allemand" (We've had him, your German Rhine) rubbing salt into the wounds Napoleon and others had caused, while Lamartine's "Peace Marseillaise" (1841) was peaceful.

He published a volume of more poems in 1841, but none achieved much popularity.

External links

http://www.jhelbach.de/dichtung/rheinli.htm  Der Rhein in der Lyrik 

1809 births
1845 deaths
Writers from Bonn
Writers from North Rhine-Westphalia
German patriotic songs
German male poets
19th-century German poets
19th-century German male writers
19th-century German writers